Supertrain is an American science fiction-adventure-drama television series that ran on NBC from February 7 to May 5, 1979. Nine episodes were made, including a two-hour pilot episode.

Premise
The series takes place on the Supertrain, a nuclear-powered high speed train that is equipped with amenities more appropriate to a cruise ship. It has luxuries such as a swimming pool, shopping centers, a gym, a library, a medical center, and a discotheque. It is so big it has to run on very broad gauge track. It runs along a route between New York City and Los Angeles, with additional stops in Chicago, Denver, and a fictional town in Texas.

Much like its contemporary The Love Boat, the plots concerned the passengers' social lives, usually with multiple intertwining storylines. Supertrain was described in a 1979 Variety review, "It's a 'Love Boat' on wheels which has yet to get on track." Most of the cast of a given episode were guest stars. The production was elaborate, with huge sets and two high-tech model trains for outside shots.

Production troubles
Supertrain was the most expensive series ever aired in the United States at the time. The production was beset by problems, including a model train that crashed. While the series was heavily advertised during the 1978-1979 season, it received poor reviews and low ratings. The 2-hour premiere was out-rated by a 2-hour special of ABC's Charlie's Angels, and received a 21.8 rating and 32 share, ranking it 17th for the week. Despite attempts to salvage the show by replacing its producer, reworking the cast and the show's genre to a sitcom-like format, and a timeslot change from Wednesdays at 8:00 p.m. to Saturdays at 10:00 p.m., it went off the air after only three months. NBC, which had produced the show itself, with help from Dark Shadows producer Dan Curtis, was unable to recoup its losses from the high production costs. This, combined with the U.S. boycott of the 1980 Summer Olympics the following season (whose coverage NBC was to have carried, costing the network millions in ad revenue), nearly bankrupted the network. For these reasons, Supertrain has been called one of the greatest television flops. The show finished 69th out of 114 shows during the 1978-79 season, with an average 15.7 rating and 25 share.

Before the show aired in the U.S., NBC sold it directly to the BBC, the first foreign broadcaster to pick up the series. "For two runs, BBC reportedly coughed up more than $25,000 per hour episode, which if not a record series price in this market is close to it." The BBC was planning to air Supertrain in the fall of 1979, after the series premiered in the U.S. in February. By selling the show to international markets, NBC hoped to offset its own development costs. After the failure of the series in the United States, the BBC never aired the show.

Reception 
In 2002, TV Guide ranked Supertrain number 28 on its "50 Worst TV Shows of All Time" list.

In the May 19, 1979, edition of TV Guide, the show received criticism from Robert MacKenzie. He compared the futuristic train to his traditional ideas of a Pullman locomotive and describes the environment as "bigger, gaudier, and noisier, including the passengers." He  described the amenities of the train and the "marvel, cinematically," of the set design and train itself. Mackenzie found fault with the show's reliance on the extravagant train to wow the audience and the lack of character depth or entertaining plot. "When the early ratings proved disappointing, NBC took the series off the air for emergency surgery. The 'All New Supertrain' appeared April 14 looking remarkably like the old Supertrain", which shows NBC's attempts to fix the show's flaws mid-season. He summarized his opinion on the newly changed episodes by stating, "This tale d-r-a-g-g-e-d even more than previous episodes despite the attempt to glamorize it with models in bikinis and Peter Lawford playing his usual shopworn sophisticate." In his annual television special later that year, comedian Alan King commented on the show's ratings failure: "It's a bird! It's a bomb! It's Supertrain!"

Supertrain was critiqued by the Telefilm Review in the February 9, 1979, edition of Variety. The article begins, "NBC's highly-promoted new Supertrain series features a slick new train of tomorrow, with a script from yesterday...it seeks to overwhelm, but underwhelms instead." By emphasizing the train as the main character, the character plots and stories of each episode seem like more of a second thought. Telefilm predicted the show's failure in its review: "Without better scripts, the train's trek may well end in 13 weeks. More emphasis on characters, less on the train, is in order." The show lasted just over 12 weeks. The choices of the producer, Dan Curtis, were harshly criticized, saying he was "neglecting characterizations for the sake of camera angles, and his contribution is a sorrowful one."

Episodes

Home media
The pilot was released on VHS, as Express to Terror in the US, and Super-Train in the UK. It was also released in Norway.

See also
 Breitspurbahn — broad-gauge railway planned by Nazi Germany.
 Snowpiercer — A 2013 science fiction film about a cruise ship-like train  (with an aquarium and a swimming pool) that went around the world serving as the last resort of humanity in a new ice age.
 The Big Bus — A 1976 comedy film that follows the maiden cross-country trip of an enormous nuclear powered bus.

References

External links
Supertrain Unofficial Site Supertrain series information including episode guide and airdates.
 Boxcutters ep 270 The Boxcutters podcast takes a look back at Supertrain (includes archive interview material).

 Telehell ep 4 The Telehell Podcast looks at the history of the show, and covers the events of the Pilot episode

1979 American television series debuts
1979 American television series endings
1970s American science fiction television series
1970s American drama television series
American adventure television series
English-language television shows
Television series about rail transport
NBC original programming
Television series by Universal Television
Television shows set in Colorado